José "Cheche" Suárez (1891–?) was a Cuban baseball pitcher and right fielder in the Negro leagues and Cuban League. He played from 1915 to 1921 with San Francisco Park, Cuban Stars (East)  and the Cuban Stars (West).

References

External links
 and Baseball-Reference Black Baseball stats and Seamheads

1891 births
Year of death missing
Cuban Stars (East) players
Cuban Stars (West) players
Cuban baseball players
San Francisco Park players
People from Cienfuegos